Chaetopappa ericoides is a species of flowering plant in the family Asteraceae known by the common names rose heath and heath-leaved chaetopappa. It is native to the southwestern and western Great Plains regions of the United States, plus northern Mexico.  It is found in California, Nevada, Arizona, Utah, New Mexico, Colorado, Wyoming, Texas, Oklahoma, Kansas, Nebraska, Chihuahua, Coahuila, Sonora, Durango, Zacatecas, San Luis Potosí, and Nuevo León.

Chaetopappa ericoides is a petite perennial herb reaching heights between 5 and 15 centimeters (2–6 inches). The hairy, glandular stem grows from a woody caudex and branches several times. The green leaves are up to about a centimeter long and are glandular and bristly. The tiny flower head is 1 or 2 centimeters wide with white or pinkish ray florets around a center of yellow disc florets. Each head has a base of pointed purple-tipped greenish phyllaries. The fruit is a hairy, round achene with a bristly white pappus.

Uses
Among the Zuni people, an infusion of whole pulverized plant applied is rubbed on the body for the pain from a cold, swellings, and rheumatism. A warm infusion of the plant is also taken to hasten parturition.

References

External links
USDA Plants Profile forChaetopappa ericoides  (rose heath)
{http://www.calflora.org/cgi-bin/species_query.cgi?where-taxon=Chaetopappa+ericoides Calflora Database: Chaetopappa ericoides (Rose heath, Heath leaved chaetopappa)]
 Jepson Manual eFlora (TJM2) treatment of Chaetopappa ericoides
Southwestern Colorado Wildflowers
Czech Botany: Chaetopappa ericoides photos — captions in Czech.
Wildflowers West.org: photos
UC Calphotos Photos gallery of Chaetopappa ericoides

ericoides
Flora of Northeastern Mexico
Flora of Northwestern Mexico
Flora of the Southwestern United States
Flora of the South-Central United States
Flora of the Great Basin
Flora of the Great Plains (North America)
Flora of the California desert regions
Plants used in traditional Native American medicine
Plants described in 1827
Flora without expected TNC conservation status